Palanglu may refer to:
 Palanglu, Parsabad